Constantin "Costi" Ioniță, known as Costi (born 14 January 1978) is a Romanian singer regarded as one of the most celebrated ethnic Romanian vocalists of muzică orientală (manele).

Career 
Born in Constanța and a dentist by training, Costi began his musical career by singing Romanian traditional folkloric music. He however achieved fame as a member of the pop boy band Valahia, enjoying several hits. In 1999, he started to experiment with manele, a composite Balkanic musical style, and in 2000 he collaborated with acclaimed manele singer Adrian Minune on Of, viața mea ("Oh, my life"), one of the first mainstream successes of the genre in Romania. Following Valahia's dissolution in 2002, he started a solo career, concentrating on manele. In this period he collaborated with several well known manele singers. His success is considered unusual, as he is one of the few ethnic Romanians in a genre perceived as Romani. Unlike some Romani counterparts, Costi Ioniță does not use a nickname. Despite his success in manele, he also experimented with other musical styles, such as  rock, dance or opera, avoiding to be identified with manele or to be too closely associated with the Romani culture.

In the late 2000s, Costi extended his act in the Balkans and Middle East, achieving success in Turkey and Saudi Arabia with the song Ca la Amsterdam ("Like in Amsterdam"), a tune included in the 2010 compilation issued by Café del Mar. He also launched several hits in Bulgaria, in collaboration with local turbo-folk singers.

In July 2007, he launched a music channel, Party TV, and in October that year his company received licence for another two music TV channels, one of them, Mynele TV, dedicated to promoting manele.

Since 2008, Costi has acted as producer and songwriter for the pop rock girl band Blaxy Girls. In 2009, he reached the finals of the Romanian selection for the Eurovision Song Contest with three songs he composed, one sung by himself, one by Blaxy Girls, and the third by another group, IMBA.

In 2015, Costi became internationally known with the Faydee Sonita song "Habibi (I Need Your Love)" that was credited to Shaggy, Mohombi, Faydee and Costi. A revamped version with a title change to "I Need Your Love" credited to Shaggy featuring Mohombi, Faydee and Costi became a hit on various U.S. dance charts and reached #66 on the Billboard Hot 100. It also peaked at #36 on the UK Singles Chart. The song has also charted on many European charts including official singles charts in Austria, Belgium, France, Germany and the Netherlands and also gained great popularity in the Middle East.

Discography

Singles featured in 

*Did not appear in the official Belgian Ultratop 50 charts, but rather in the bubbling under Ultratip charts.

References

External links 
Official Costi Music Production website

1978 births
Living people
People from Constanța
Romanian dance musicians
Romanian manele singers
Romanian male pop singers
Romanian record producers
21st-century Romanian male singers
21st-century Romanian singers